Yumsem Matey is a politician from Lazu Village, (OLLO Community) Tirap Dist. Arunachal Pradesh, state in India. 
He is member of Arunachal Pradesh Assembly from Khonsa West in Tirap district. He belong to Indian National congress.
First Graduate from OLLO Community (BA.Hons.in History), in the year 1992–93, from Government College, Itanagar, Arunachal Pradesh. 
Served as District Adult Education Officer (DAEO) in Changlang, Changlang District, Arunachal Pradesh.

Elected as MLA from 56th Khonsa West Assembly Constituency, in the year 2009 from INC (Indian National Congress), to the post of Parliamentary Secretary; Department of Women and Social Welfare, Social Justice and Tribal Affairs, and DOTCL (Department of Tirap, Changlang and Longding)

Recently, in 2015 Yumsem Matey joined the BJP (Bharat Janta Party).

References 

People from Khonsa
Arunachal Pradesh MLAs 2014–2019
Living people
Year of birth missing (living people)